Vincent Milou (born November 11, 1996) is a regular-footed French professional skateboarder from Tarnos.

Skateboarding 
In 2018, Milou did a front bluntslide on the handrail at el Toro before the 2019 skatestopping of the spot.

Competitions 
In 2018, Milou placed first, above Daisuke Ikeda and Aurélien Giraud, at FISE WORLD, Montpellier.

In July 2019, Milou placed third at the Street League Skateboarding Championship - Los Angeles, finishing behind Yuto Horigome and Maurio McCoy.

Major results
2014
 1st Old School Jam, Villiers-sur-Orge
 4th Mystic Skate Cup (street), Prague
2015
 7th Am Getting Paid, Montreal
 6th Kimberley Diamond Cup Street World Championships, Kimberley, South Africa
2016
 1st Far'n High, Paris
 3rd European Series Am, London
 2nd European Series Am, Paris
 3rd Beroun Grand Prix Pro, Czech Republic
 2nd Mystic Skate Cup (street), Prague
 3rd European Series Am, Berlin
 1st Fise World Series (park)
 3rd World Cup, Moscow
2017
 2nd Far'n High, Paris
 3rd Nike Berlin Open
 1st Fælledparken Open (street), Copenhagen
 2nd Copenhagen Open: The Triangle
 6th Copenhagen Open: Street Contest
 4th Damn Am, Amsterdam
 7th Tampa Am
2018
 6th Cowtown's Phoenix Am
 1st Fise Street Pro, Montpellier
 2nd Street League Pro Open, London
 7th Red Bull Rollercoaster, Germany
 6th Street League, Huntington Beach
2019
 2nd Far'n High, Paris
 3rd World Skate Street League Pro Tour (street), Los Angeles
 1st European Street Championships, Basel, Switzerland
2021
 4th Skateboarding at the 2020 Summer Olympics – Men's street, Tokyo

Source

References 

French skateboarders
1996 births
Living people
Olympic skateboarders of France
Skateboarders at the 2020 Summer Olympics